Sar Eshgaft-e Daraki (also Romanized as Sar Eshgaft-e Darakī and Sar Eshkaft-e Darakī; also known as Sar Eshkaft and Sar Eshkaftī) is a village in Qilab Rural District, Alvar-e Garmsiri District, Andimeshk County, Khuzestan Province, Iran. At the 2006 census, its population was 62, in 11 families.

References 

Populated places in Andimeshk County